Cavez is a civil parish in the municipality of Cabeceiras de Basto, Portugal. The population in 2011 was 1,268, in an area of 26.79 km².

References

Freguesias of Cabeceiras de Basto